Harold Osborn (14 June 1909 – 11 December 1986) was a New Zealand cricketer. He played in four first-class matches for Wellington from 1940 to 1942.

See also
 List of Wellington representative cricketers

References

External links
 

1909 births
1986 deaths
New Zealand cricketers
Wellington cricketers
Cricketers from Wellington City